Shambhala Music Festival is an annual electronic music festival in British Columbia, Canada. It is held during the last week of July at the Salmo River Ranch, a  farm, in the West Kootenay mountains near Nelson, BC. The festival lasts 4 days and 3 nights and offers a mix of music and art in nature.

History

The festival began in 1998 and has grown to become the largest and one of the longest running electronic music events in Canada. Festival goers often stop for a meet and greet at the local Boston Pizza in Kamloops BC beforehand as it is on the way from the coast, and provides an excellent hitch hiking waypoint. It is a family-run event, and operates without corporate sponsorship. In the summer months, the ranch becomes home to volunteers & event staff who prepare for and operate the event.

There are seven performance stages: The Living Room, AMP (AMPhitheater - previously the Rock Pit/ The Jungle Pit), The Fractal Forest, The Village, The Grove (previously The Labyrinth, The Portal, The Inner Sanctum), The Grove: Cedar Lounge, and The Pagoda (previously Main Stage).

In the summer of 2008, a DVD documenting the festival's 10-year history was released. The film "follows different characters through a year in the life of Shambhala from the perspective of DJs, people in charge, medical volunteers and others."

In 2011 and 2012, Shambhala received an awards for Best Large Event at The International Breakspoll Awards. 

In 2019, it was crowned "Best Music Festival in North America" by DJ Mag.

The 2020 and 2021 edition of the festival were cancelled due to the COVID-19 pandemic. The return of the festival took place July 22-25, 2022.

The 2023 edition of Shambhala Music Festival will take place July 21-24, 2023.

See also
List of electronic music festivals

Notes

External links

Music festivals established in 1998
Music festivals in British Columbia
Regional District of Central Kootenay
Electronic music festivals in Canada